Rear Admiral Sir Godfrey Marshall Paine,  (21 November 1871 – 23 March 1932) was a senior officer in the Royal Navy and the Royal Air Force in the early part of the 20th century. He played a leading role in joint and naval flying training before and during the First World War.

Godfrey Marshall Paine was born on 21 November 1871, the fourth son of James Paine and his wife Henrietta Grace (née Allen).

Naval career
Paine joined the Royal Navy as a midshipman in early 1885. In 1903 Paine was promoted to commander and later served as the executive officer on his old ship HMS Renown.

In 1907 Paine was promoted captain and in 1909 he was appointed the Officer Commanding the Third Destroyer Flotilla. This appointment was followed by command of the torpedo schoolship  in 1911. It was while Paine was in command of Actaeon that he first became involved in naval aviation. The first four royal naval and royal marine officers who learnt to fly (Longmore, Samson, Gerrard and Gregory) were borne on the books of Actaeon and Paine took a keen interest in their progress.

In 1912, Paine was appointed as the first commandant of the Central Flying School at Upavon, so, before taking up this post, he learned to fly, being awarded Pilot's Licence No. 217 on 15 May 1912 (at the age of 40). Three years later in 1915, after the Royal Naval Air Service had formally separated from the Royal Flying Corps, the Royal Navy established the Central Depot and Training Establishment. The new unit was based at Cranwell and Paine was raised to the rank of commodore, first class, and sent there as its first commander. Just over a year later, in early 1917, Paine was appointed Fifth Sea Lord, making him responsible for all naval aviation.

RAF and later career
With the establishment of the RAF in 1918, the posts of Fifth Sea Lord and Chief of Naval Air Service were abolished and the Navy's aircraft and aviators were transferred to the RAF. Paine was promoted to major general (a rank of the RAF at that time) and appointed to the Air Council as Master-General of Personnel. With the introduction of RAF-specific ranks in 1919, Paine was regraded to air vice marshal. His last military appointment was as Inspector-General of the RAF. On his retirement from the RAF on 12 May 1920, Paine was granted the rank of retired rear admiral.

References

External links

thePeerage.com – Rear-Admiral Sir Godfrey Marshall Paine

|-
 

|-
 

|-

|-
 

|-

1871 births
1932 deaths
Foreign recipients of the Distinguished Service Medal (United States)
Knights Commander of the Order of the Bath
Lords of the Admiralty
Members of the Royal Victorian Order
Recipients of the Order of the Rising Sun
Royal Air Force air marshals
Royal Air Force generals of World War I
Royal Navy rear admirals
Royal Naval Air Service aviators
Recipients of the Navy Distinguished Service Medal